Villas may refer to:

Places
 Villas, Florida, United States
 Villas, Illinois, United States
 Villas, New Jersey, United States
 Las Villas, a region of Spain
 Las Villas (Cuba), a former Cuban Province
 The Villas, a housing estate in Stoke-upon-Trent, England

Other uses
 Villa, a type of house
 Villa (fly), a genus of insects
 The Villas (band), an American rock band
 Violetta Villas (1938–2011), Belgian-born Polish singer, actress, and songwriter

See also
Las Tres Villas 
Cinco Villas (disambiguation)
Castillo Siete Villas, a town in Arnuero, Cantabria, Spain
Villasbuenas
Villas Boas 
Benalúa de las Villas
Villa (disambiguation)
Vila (disambiguation)
Vilas (disambiguation)